Gal Uchovsky (born September 27, 1958) is an Israeli screenwriter, producer, journalist, activist and Israeli TV personality.

Early life

Uchovsky was born in Hadera. His family moved to Vienna where his father studies. They returned to Hadera when he was five-years-old. He attended high school at the Pardes Hana Agricultural High School. In his youth he excelled in sports and even played for a short time for Maccabi Pardes Katz [clarification needed]. At the age of 14, he was registered twice on the team's squad and appeared once on the field. He started his military service in a pilot 's course for the first 11 months.

After his military service he lived in Tel Aviv and studied photography at the Camera Obscura school as well as law at Tel Aviv University. Worked for seven years as a flight attendant at El Al.

Career

Journalist 
In 1983, while still a student, Uchovsky was one of the three publishers of the humor magazine "Tick in the Mind." He then wrote for the Ha-Ir as a columnist and culture editor and later editor.

In 1993 he began working for Maariv where he served as a music reporter and culture editor.

Film producer 
Uchovsky worked on the soundtrack to Eytan Fox's film Shirat Ha'Sirena (Siren's Song, 1994). In 1997 he wrote a third of the episodes of the first season of Fox's TV series Florentine. In 1998 he wrote his first feature script for the TV drama Baal Baal Lev, which was directed by Fox.

In 2002 he co-produced the Fox film Yossi & Jagger.

In 2004 he wrote and produced the Fox movie Walk on Water. 

In 2005, Ohovsky co-created with Fox The Bubble.

TV presenter 
In 1993 he hosted "Lila Rock" on Channel 3.

In 1997 he began hosting the cultural program "The Small Circle " on Channel 2.

From 2006-2010 he was part of the judging panel of Kohav Nolad.

In 2009 he hosted Soundtrack of the Decade on Channel 24. 

In 2010 he co-hosted Gal and Margul.

In 2011 he co-hosted Gal and Eliraz.

In 2012 he hosted the current affairs program "What are you saying?" and hosted the interview program Paskol Chai and also began serving as a judge on the reality show "Eyal Golan is calling you."

In 2015 he participated in the third season of Golstar.

In June 2019 he began hosting 24 at Tsehriim.

In May 2020 he wrote and co-directed the docu-series The Proud Revolution.

Awards and recognition
Uchovsky won "Best Screenwriter" award at the Durban International Film Festival for the film The Bubble.

Personal life 
Gal Uchovsky has lived in Tel Aviv with Eytan Fox since 1988. 

Uchovsky is a co-founder and served as president of Israel Gay Youth (IGY) and Uchovsky took an active role in Tel Aviv Pride Parade. He co-hosted the first-ever Miss Trans Israel in 2016.

In November 2021, police opened an investigation into accusations of sexual assault levelled against Uchovsky after an investigation from the Israeli Public Broadcasting Corporation published testimonies of two people who accused Uchovsky of sexual misconduct. In response to the exposé, Uchovsky stepped down as president of Israel Gay Youth. In July 2022, police closed the case with no charges filed. After interviews with both Uchovsky and the accusers police determined that no laws were broken.

Filmography
1994: Shirat Ha'Sirena (English title Siren's Song) - music consultant
1997: Florentin - screenwriter (TV series)
1997: Ba'al Ba'al Lev - screenwriter
2002: Yossi & Jagger - producer, music consultant
2004: Walk on Water - producer, screenwriter
2006: The Bubble - producer, screenwriter

Appearances
2009: Gay Days, documentary by Yair Qedar

See also
Television in Israel
Israeli cinema

References

External links

1958 births
Living people
Israeli film producers
Israeli male screenwriters
Gay screenwriters
Israeli gay writers
Gay Jews
Israeli LGBT screenwriters
LGBT film producers
People from Hadera